In electronics, a micropup is a style of triode  vacuum tube (valve) developed during World War II for use at very high frequencies such as those used in radar. They are characterized by an external anode block, which allows better heat dissipation. These tubes could deliver radio frequency power on the order of kilowatts at wavelengths as short as 25 cm, and on the order of 100 kW at 200 MHz in pulses. Micropup tubes used very high voltages to minimize the transit time of electrons between anode and cathode.

The micropup vacuum tube was made possible by the development of vacuum-tight joining of copper to glass, around 1939. The designs used a cylindrical anode and a concentric cylindrical grid electrode; the cathode was directly heated thoriated tungsten wires, which after the first types were all oxide coated to improve electron emission. One type, the NT99 developed by GEC could produce up to 200 kW peak output (for a pair of tubes) when used in 600 MHz radar sets. A 50 cm radar set using micropup triodes was used by HMS Suffolk to track movements of the Bismarck.

Although widely used in "metre-band" radar systems, the cavity magnetron was able to produce significant power at much higher frequencies, as radar systems developed during the war.

References

Vacuum tubes
Radar